Marmion Avenue is a  arterial road in the northern coastal suburbs of Perth, Western Australia, linking Trigg in the south with Yanchep in the north. It forms part of State Route 71 along with West Coast Highway, which it joins onto at its southern terminus.

Route Description

Marmion Avenue is part of State Route 71, from the southern terminus to Hester Avenue, continuing on from West Coast Highway. It commences in Trigg, traveling generally parallel with the Indian Ocean coastline, and the other north-south arterials Mitchell Freeway and Wanneroo Road, through mostly residential areas and some undeveloped land north of Currambine, and terminates in Yanchep. Marmion Avenue is managed by Main Roads Western Australia after previously being managed by the City of Joondalup from Ocean Reef Road to the City of Joondalup-Wanneroo boundary, and the City of Wanneroo for the rest of the road.

Marmion Avenue is a four-lane dual carriageway for its entire length. The speed limit is mostly , with brief  sections near the southern terminus in Karrinyup and through Butler, and a  section near the northern terminus in Yanchep.

Trigg to Currambine
Marmion Avenue starts as a four-lane dual carriageway as a continuation of West Coast Highway, at the traffic light controlled intersection with Karrinyup Road in the City of Stirling. Then, Marmion Avenue travels for  past the Star Swamp Reserve to the west and the residential area of Carine to the west, before intersecting with Beach Road, and crossing over into the City of Joondalup.

Marmion Avenue continues north through residential areas, intersecting with Ocean Reef Road, Hodges Drive, Shenton Avenue and Moore Drive, and passing by Currambine Central Shopping Centre, before intersecting with Burns Beach Road.

North of Currambine
North of Burns Beach Road, Marmion Avenue passes through  of residential areas, before crossing into the City of Wanneroo and travelling through  of undeveloped land in Tamala Park. Marmion Avenue provides access to the Tamala Park Rubbish Disposal Site. The roundabout with Hester Avenue and Anchorage Drive North represents the northern terminus of State Route 71, though this is not indicated via road signage.

Marmion Avenue then travels northwards through the recently developed suburbs of Alkimos and Eglinton, providing access to current and future developments. After , Marmion Avenue reaches the outer suburb of Yanchep, and terminates at a large roundabout with Yanchep Beach Road. The road continues as Splendid Avenue further north. At present, it only provides access to a local sporting ground and newer residential development in Yanchep, and is planned to be a major distributor road for Yanchep in the future.

History

Marmion Avenue was first built as an arterial road that tracked the then-new outer northern suburbs of Perth, following the limit of the Perth metropolitan area as it expanded northwards. In the late 1960s, the road originally began at Beach Road in Marmion, giving the road its namesake.

Until the early 1980s, the road was a two-lane single carriageway connecting the coastal suburbs of Marmion and Mullaloo Beach. In 1984–85, the road was extended southwards to Karrinyup Road where it joined seamlessly onto West Coast Highway, which had been realigned further inland around the same time. Now the most important road in Perth's coastal suburbs, Marmion Avenue was duplicated up to Whitfords Avenue. In early 1986, it was assigned State Route 71, and from then on was gradually extended as a single carriageway road further north – extending first to Prendiville Avenue (just north of Ocean Reef Road), to Burns Beach Road in 1991 and to Quinns Road in the mid-1990s. Marmion Avenue was finally duplicated to its terminus in 2001, with the last portion being the empty stretch between Burns Beach Road & Quinns Rocks.

In 2000 and 2001, Reid Highway was extended as a two lane road from its terminus at Mitchell Freeway to Marmion Avenue, providing another link to the east. This section was later upgraded to a four-lane dual carriageway in 2015–2016.

After delays due to disagreements at State Government level about what route the road should follow, Marmion Avenue was extended further north to Yanchep and opened to traffic in November 2008. The extension opened as a single carriageway, but earthworks have already been undertaken to enable conversion to dual carriageway at a later date, which eventuated starting from 2018. The extension also features roundabouts at future major junctions. The completion of this extension allowed the future satellite city of Alkimos/Eglinton to begin construction.

On 1 July 2010, fixed red light and speed cameras were installed at the Marmion Avenue / Hepburn Avenue intersection to fine people who run red lights and speed, so the number of road deaths in Western Australia can be reduced.

In 2016, the existing Marmion Avenue / Mullaloo Drive intersection was upgraded from a non-signalised t-junction to a roundabout in response to a ranking as the 39th Worst Intersection. Pedestrian paths were re-aligned, off-road cycling paths were added, Western Power light poles were upgraded and crash barriers were installed to protect residents and pedestrians.

As part of Main Roads Western Australia's Traffic Congestion Management Program, Marmion Avenue's intersections with Hepburn Avenue and Whitfords Avenue were upgraded during 2016 and 2017 to improve traffic flow and safety. Between 2010 and 2015, there were 249 crashes at both of these intersections combined, and 72,000 vehicle use both these intersections per day. This project was funded by the state government, and cost $12 million. Longer and additional turning lanes were added, pedestrian and cycling facilities were upgraded, traffic signals were upgraded and power lines were put underground. CCTV was also installed so that Main Roads can monitor traffic flow. Construction started in November 2016 and finished ahead of schedule in May 2017.

During 2017, works were undertaken to widen Marmion Avenue to a four-lane dual carriageway between Lukin Drive and Butler Boulevard. The project cost $2.21 million and was funded by the City of Wanneroo. Construction started in February 2017 and was complete by August.

Construction started in 2018 on upgrading Marmion Avenue north of Camborne Parkway, from the current 2-lane single carriageway to a 4-lane dual carriageway. The state government has allocated the City of Wanneroo $23 million to upgrade the road. It is being done in three stages, with the first stage up to Alkimos already completed. The whole project is scheduled to be complete by 2020.

Future
Extensions of Marmion Avenue are possible to Two Rocks. However, there are no plans for this at present. Perth's Transport at 3.5 million plan does not say that Marmion Avenue will be extended, and the Department of Planning's documents currently show Marmion Avenue terminating at Yanchep. One possible complication would be Two Rocks's past use as a munitions dump, meaning that most non-suburban sections of the suburb are fenced off.

The ultimate plan is for Marmion Avenue to become a six-lane dual carriageway between Alkimos and Yanchep, and a four-lane dual carriageway for the rest of the road. Also, the intersection with Yanchep Beach Road may be grade separated by 2050.

Junction List

Gallery

References

See also
 West Coast Highway, Perth
 List of major roads in Perth, Western Australia
 

Roads in Perth, Western Australia
Articles containing video clips